The Roebling Medal is the highest award of the Mineralogical Society of America for scientific eminence as represented primarily by scientific publication of outstanding original research in mineralogy. The award is named for Colonel Washington A. Roebling (1837–1926) who was an engineer, bridge builder, mineral collector, and significant friend of the Mineralogical Society of America. It is awarded for scientific eminence represented by scientific publication of outstanding original research in mineralogy. The recipient receives an engraved medal and is made a Life Fellow of the Mineralogical Society.

Roebling Medal Recipients
The recipients of the medal are:

1937 – Charles Palache
1938 – Waldemar T. Schaller
1940 – Leonard James Spencer
1941 – Esper S. Larsen Jr.
1945 – Edward Henry Kraus
1946 – Clarence S. Ross
1947 – Paul Niggli
1948 – William Lawrence Bragg
1949 – Herbert E. Merwin
1950 – Norman L. Bowen
1952 – Frederick E. Wright
1953 – William F. Foshag
1954 – Cecil Edgar Tilley
1955 – Alexander N. Winchell
1956 – Arthur F. Buddington
1957 – Walter F. Hunt
1958 – Martin J. Buerger
1959 – Felix Machatschki
1960 – Tom F. W. Barth
1961 – Paul Ramdohr
1962 – John W. Gruner
1963 – John Frank Schairer
1964 – Clifford Frondel
1965 – Adolf Pabst
1966 – Max H. Hey
1967 – Linus Pauling
1968 – Tei-ichi Ito
1969 – Fritz Laves
1970 – George W. Brindley
1971 – J. D. H. Donnay
1972 – Elburt F. Osborn
1973 – George Tunell
1974 – Ralph E. Grim
1975 – Michael Fleischer
1975 – O. Frank Tuttle
1976 – Carl W. Correns
1977 – Raimond Castaing
1978 – James B. Thompson Jr.
1979 – W. H. Taylor
1980 – 
1981 – Robert M. Garrels
1982 – Joseph V. Smith
1983 – Hans P. Eugster
1984 – Paul B. Barton Jr.
1985 – Francis John Turner
1986 – Edwin Roedder
1987 – Gerald V. Gibbs
1988 – Julian R. Goldsmith
1989 – Helen D. Megaw
1990 – Sturges W. Bailey
1991 – E-An Zen
1992 – Hatten S. Yoder Jr.
1993 – Brian Harold Mason
1994 – William A. Bassett
1995 – William S. Fyfe
1996 – Donald H. Lindsley
1997 – Ian S. E. Carmichael
1998 – C. Wayne Burnham
1999 – Ikuo Kushiro
2000 – Robert C. Reynolds Jr.
2001 – Peter J. Wyllie
2002 – Werner F. Schreyer
2003 – Charles T. Prewitt
2004 – Francis R. Boyd
2005 – Ho-kwang Mao
2006 – W. Gary Ernst
2007 – Gordon E. Brown Jr.
2008 – Bernard W. Evans
2009 – Alexandra Navrotsky
2010 – Robert C. Newton
2011 – Juhn G. Liou
2012 – Harry W. Green, II
2013 – Frank C. Hawthorne
2014 – Bernard J. Wood
2015 – Rodney C. Ewing
2016 – Robert M. Hazen
2017 - Edward M. Stolper
2018 – E. Bruce Watson
2019 – Peter R. Buseck
2020 – Andrew Putnis
2021 – George R. Rossman

See also

 List of geology awards

References

Mineralogy
Geology awards
American science and technology awards
Awards established in 1937
Earth sciences awards